David Letele (born 9 September 1979 in Auckland, New Zealand), also known as the Brown Buttabean, is a retired professional boxer from New Zealand. After retiring, Letele became a well known Motivational Speaker. He created his own fitness gym with no equipment, giving out free meals for the homeless and runs a foodbank for people in need.

Weight loss motivation
Letele has lost over 90 kg by April 2016. His weight loss inspired him to help others out by supporting and educating everyday people on their health and wellness journey. At first it was only a Facebook group that Letele created which has reached over 5600 and growing every day. Most people lose a minimum of 5 kg each and many have lost up to 50 kg which is over 25,000 kg combined. Buttabean motivation helps people lose weight by doing weekly boot camps, dieting programs, support groups, fitness plans, community work and occasional school visits.

In June 2015, Letele announced that he had launched a new website to help motivate people on their weight-loss journey. In 2017, Brown Buttabean Motivation has reach 8000 members.

In November 2017, Letele received a special honour award at the Pacific People's Award at the Vodafone Events Centre, Manukau City, New Zealand. Letele was honoured
for his contribution to the community in his battle against obesity in the Pacific community in New Zealand. After accepting the award he got the entire arena to stand up and do an impromptu boot camp.

In February 2019, Letele broke the world record for the number of people performing frog squats simultaneously at a boot camp event that he hosted at Eden Park. This happened on 24 February 2019 with 1711 participating in the event.

Rugby League

Letele played League at an early age, establishing himself very quickly. At  the age of 16, Letele was already training with Maori representative New Zealand team, however Letele wasn't able to see the field due to shattering his knee in training.

Letele was signed onto the New Zealand A team, attracting the National Rugby League (NRL) team the New Zealand Warriors, however due to knee problems he was sidelined again.

Letele signed on to play for the minor premiership team, North Sydney Bears. While being with the bears, the team has won three titles. Letele has also played for Cootamundra Bulldogs and AS Carcassonne in France before retiring.

Boxing

Letele was an accomplished corporate boxer fighting multiple times on Duco Events’ card before turning pro. He has his nobility as a professional boxer, public figure and has made unique, prolific or innovative contributions to a field of entertainment as he puts on a character when he is in the ring with a mic, in the media or at the weigh in as the Brown Buttabean. His alias the "Brown Buttabean" is inspired by Eric Esch's Butterbean. Letele has received mixed reactions from the media and the general public, calling him Duco's Circus act.

Duco Events created their own title, which is the exact replica from the Rocky (film series). With this title Letele puts out an open challenge to the locals to fight him at 4x2 minute rounds at a weight limit of 100 kg. The added stipulation is that if Leteles opponent knocks him out, they will receive ten thousand dollars.

Corporate world Champion to professional fighter 2014 - 2015
Letele won the title against John Lomu (who is the brother of Jonah Lomu) on 16 October 2014. Letele won by TKO in the second round. Letele lost the first fight but defended his title for the second time against Waikato Rugby Union Prop Loni Uhila on 6 December 2014. Letele won by SD event though a lot of people thought Uhila won. The NZPBA recognise Letele's fights from here onwards as professional fights and not corporate fights, even though the rules stayed at corporate rules. In March 2015, fought on the Cairo George vs Nort Beauchamp undercard against Tamati Keefe. The bout was for the inaugural King of the Coromandel Heavyweight boxing title. Letele won the bout by Unanimous decision.

On 4 March 2015, the day before his fight against Finau Maka at the weigh in, both fighters got into a fight. Letele grabbed Maka on the throat pushing him back, Maka retaliated by tackling him to the ground, however the fight was broken off quickly. Letele defended the title for the third time against former Tonga national rugby union team star Finau Maka on 5 March 2015. Letele won by TKO in the first round. In July 2015, WBA Oceania ranked Letele in their regional ratings. Letele defended his title for the fourth and fifth time by fighting two people on the same night. This was the only time NZPBA did not recognize Letele's fights as pro bouts since fighting Loni Uhila. The NZPBA did not recognizes the two bouts as pro due to both bouts didn't make minimum scheduled time limit of either 4x2 minute rounds or 3x3 minute rounds. Both of the bouts were scheduled for 3x2 minute rounds. Letele fought the winner of the Christchurch Corporate Boxing Tournament Jae Jae Smith and local Lordly Kaihua. Letele won both bouts in the third round by TKO.

First defeat with redemption 2015
Letele defended his title for the sixth and final time on 1 August 2015 against former Southland Rugby Football Union player Kaleni Taetuli. Letele lost the bout in 22 second in the first round by TKO. In 2015, Letele moved to a new gym and trainer, trained by John Conway. On 14 October 2015 the day before his second fight against Kaleni Taetuli at the weigh in, Letele lashed out and try to attack Taetuli while screaming out "You won the lottery last time". Leteles team grabbed him before he could get his hands onto Taetuli. Kaleni Taetuli defended the title against Letele on 15 October. If Taetuli won by knockout, he would have received fifteen thousand dollars instead of the usual ten thousand dollar stipulation. It has been reported that win, lose or draw this will be Taetuli's last fight. Letele won the fight by majority decision.

Second Defeat, Redemption to retirement 2015 - 2016
Letele defended his regained title against Loni Uhila in a rematch, one year after their first bout. Uhila won against Letele by UD, making this the second loss in Letele's boxing career. Since their last fight Uhila has signed on to Hurricanes (rugby union). In January 2016, Letele fought Silivelio Pekepo aka Batman in Samoa. This was the first time that Letele has fought in Samoa. Pekepo called Letele out back in 2015 when Letele fought two boxers in one night, however Letele fought someone else. Letele declared the bout to be for the Duco Event's USA Heavyweight title and the Duco Event's Intercontinental Heavyweight title. Letele won the bout against Pekepo by Unanimous decision. In April 2016, Letele fought in Australia for the second time. This time he fought for what was called the vacant Duco Event's Corporate World Australia Title. Letele fought Australian Kickboxer Wayne Pepe. Letele easily won by TKO in the first round. In May 2016, Letele fought in more of a traditional bout then he is usually use to. Letele fought Conrad Lam at 4x3 min rounds with no standing 8 counts. Conrad Lam won the bout by split decision. Letele will be fighting against JaeJae Smith for the second time. The last the two fought was in Palmerston North back in June 2015, where Letele fought two people in one night. Letele won both fights by TKO. Letele fought Barlow twice in his career, first in Waitara, New Zealand as the main event in October 2016. Second time they fought was on the Joseph Parker vs. Andy Ruiz undercard. The fight was not televised, however it was the opener of the event. This fight was Letele's retirement fight.

Exhibition boxing record

|-  style="text-align:center; background:#e3e3e3;"
|  style="border-style:none none solid solid; "|Opponent
|  style="border-style:none none solid solid; "|Date
|  style="border-style:none none solid solid; "|Location
|  style="border-style:none none solid solid; "|Notes
|- align=center
|align=left|Shaun Rankin 
|
|align=left|
|align=left|Rankin promoted the event as well as fought in the main event against Letele.

Corporate boxing record

|-  style="text-align:center; background:#e3e3e3;"
|  style="border-style:none none solid solid; "|Res.
|  style="border-style:none none solid solid; "|Record
|  style="border-style:none none solid solid; "|Opponent
|  style="border-style:none none solid solid; "|Type
|  style="border-style:none none solid solid; "|Rd., Time
|  style="border-style:none none solid solid; "|Date
|  style="border-style:none none solid solid; "|Location
|  style="border-style:none none solid solid; "|Notes
|- align=center
|Win
|5–0
|align=left|George Hola
|
|
|
|align=left|
|align=left|
|- align=center
|Win
|4–0
|align=left| Lordly Kaihua
|
|
|
|align=left|
|align=left|
|- align=center
|Win
|3–0
|align=left| JaeJae Smith
|
|
|
|align=left|
|align=left|
|- align=center
|Win
|2–0
|align=left| John Lomu
|
|
|
|align=left|
|align=left| 
|- align=center
|Win
|1–0
|align=left| Lopini Vatuvei
|
|
|
|align=left|
|align=left|

Professional boxing record

|-  style="text-align:center; background:#e3e3e3;"
|  style="border-style:none none solid solid; "|Res.
|  style="border-style:none none solid solid; "|Record
|  style="border-style:none none solid solid; "|Opponent
|  style="border-style:none none solid solid; "|Type
|  style="border-style:none none solid solid; "|Rd., Time
|  style="border-style:none none solid solid; "|Date
|  style="border-style:none none solid solid; "|Location
|  style="border-style:none none solid solid; "|Notes
|- align=center
|Lose
|16–4
|align=left| Manu Vatuvei
|
|
|
|align=left|
|align=left|
|- align=center
|Win
|16–3
|align=left| Luke Mealamu
|
|
|
|align=left|
|align=left|
|- align=center
|Win
|15–3
|align=left|Che Barlow
|
|
|
|align=left|
|align=left|
|- align=center
|Win
|14–3
|align=left|Che Barlow
|
|
|
|align=left|
|align=left|
|- align=center
|Win
|13–3
|align=left|Clarence Tillman
|
|
|
|align=left|
|align=left|
|- align=center
|Win
|12–3
|align=left|JaeJae Smith
|
|
|
|align=left|
|align=left|
|- align=center
|Lose
|11–3
|align=left|Conrad Lam
|
|
|
|align=left|
|align=left|
|- align=center
|Win
|11–2
|align=left|Wayne Pepe
|
|
|
|align=left|
|align=left|
|- align=center
|Win
|10–2
|align=left|Silivelio Pekepo
|
|
|
|align=left|
|align=left|
|- align=center
|Lose
|9–2
|align=left| Loni Uhila
|
|
|
|align=left|
|align=left|
|- align=center
|Win
|9–1
|align=left| Gavin Somers
|
|
|
|align=left|
|align=left|
|- align=center
|Win
|8–1
|align=left| Kaleni Taetuli
|
|
|
|align=left|
|align=left|
|- align=center
|Loss
|7–1
|align=left| Kaleni Taetuli
|
|
|
|align=left|
|align=left|
|- align=center
|Win
|7–0
|align=left| James Levao
|
|
|
|align=left|
|align=left|
|- align=center
|Win
|6–0
|align=left| Rob Manual
|
|
|
|align=left|
|align=left|
|- align=center
|Win
|5–0
|align=left| Tamati Keefe
|
|
|
|align=left|
|align=left|
|- align=center
|Win
|4–0
|align=left| Finau Maka
|
|
|
|align=left|
|align=left|
|- align=center
|Win
|3–0
|align=left| AyJay Su'a
|
|
|
|align=left|
|align=left|
|- align=center
|Win
|2–0
|align=left| Loni Uhila
|
|
|
|align=left|
|align=left|
|- align=center
|Win
|1–0
|align=left| Rhys Sullivan
|
|
|
|align=left|
|align=left|

Titles in boxing

Minor World Titles:
(2) Duco Events Corporate World Heavyweight Champion (274 lbs)
King of the Coromandel Heavyweight Champion (302 lbs)
Duco Event's Corporate Intercontinental Heavyweight Champion (242½ lbs)
Duco Event's Corporate USA Heavyweight Champion (242½ lbs)
Duco Event's Corporate World Australia Heavyweight Champion (266 lbs)

Post boxing
In December 2015, Letele announced that he will be retiring from boxing at the end of 2016. Letele plans on opening his own, become a personal trainer and continue his Buttabean motivation group. Despite announcing his retirement in December 2016 on the Joseph Parker vs. Andy Ruiz undercard, Letele made his one off in ring return in February 2017 and December 2018.

Letele was a contestant on the 2022 season of the dancing show Dancing with the Stars.

Personal life
Letele is of Māori and Samoan descent. From an early age he endured a uniquely tough upbringing. His father, Dave, joined the Mongrel Mob at just 13. Six years later, he became Auckland president. That troubled path led to six years in jail for armed robbery. Letele's uncle also spent half his life behind bars. Since their release they helped form a foundation – called Grace – to support families facing similar problems. But, at the time, Letele was forced to find his own way in the world. Not long ago Letele, who played professional rugby league in Australia and France, tipped the scales at a whopping 210 kg. His weight blew out after suffering difficult, lonely times in Australia. The problems stemmed from taking on two supermarkets, only for finance to bottom out. Close friend and former Selwyn College classmate, Duco promoter David Higgins, was concerned about Letele's health and offered him a lifeline on Parker's undercard. Having moved back to Auckland he's now doing everything possible to support his three sons.

References

1979 births
Living people
New Zealand male boxers
Heavyweight boxers
Boxers from Auckland
New Zealand rugby league players
Weight loss
Rugby league players from Auckland
New Zealand Māori people
New Zealand sportspeople of Samoan descent